Bert Koomen (born 3 January 1997) is a Dutch footballer who plays for Rijnsburgse Boys in the Tweede Divisie.

Club career
He made his professional debut in the Eerste Divisie for FC Den Bosch on 3 March 2017 in a game against FC Emmen.

References

External links
 
 

1997 births
People from Teylingen
Living people
Dutch footballers
FC Den Bosch players
Eerste Divisie players
Association football fullbacks
Ter Leede players
Netherlands youth international footballers
FC Lisse players
Rijnsburgse Boys players
Feyenoord players
Tweede Divisie players
Footballers from South Holland